The Dospat is a river in the Western Rhodope Mountains, the most important tributary of the Mesta.

It takes its source from Bulgaria, from the 1643-metre-high Rozov vrah ("Rose Peak") and flows southeast until Dospat Dam, after which it makes a turn southwest to continue generally to the south and flow into the Mesta as a left tributary near the village Mikrokleisoura on Greek territory just south of the Greek-Bulgarian border.

The Dospat has a drainage basin of 633.5 km2. Its length is 110 km, of which 79 in Bulgaria and 21 in Greece. For a small distance of 3 km it forms the Greek–Bulgarian border.

References

Rivers of Bulgaria
Rivers of Greece
Landforms of Smolyan Province
Landforms of Pazardzhik Province
Rhodope Mountains
Geography of Thrace
Chech
International rivers of Europe
Landforms of Drama (regional unit)
Rivers of Eastern Macedonia and Thrace
Bulgaria–Greece border
Border rivers